Gladys Rosa Moisés (10 September 1961 – 5 March 2022) was an Argentine politician. She died of cancer in San José de Metán on 5 March 2022, at the age of 60.

References

1961 births
2022 deaths
21st-century Argentine women politicians
21st-century Argentine politicians
Republican Proposal politicians
National University of Tucumán alumni
People from Salta Province
Deaths from cancer in Argentina